Volkswagen Bus or Volkswagen Van is a type of vehicle produced by Volkswagen/Volkswagen Commercial Vehicles.

There have been a number of notable versions of it produced.

Volkswagen Bus light commercial vehicles
Six generations of Volkswagen Transporter (aka Microbus) vans:
Volkswagen Type 2
Volkswagen Type 2 (T1), generation T1 (Microbus, or Split-screen bus)
Volkswagen Type 2 (T2), generation T2 ("Bay window" bus)
Volkswagen Type 2 (T3), generation T3 (Vanagon)
Volkswagen Transporter (T4), generation T4 (EuroVan)
Volkswagen Transporter (T5), generation T5 (EuroVan)
Volkswagen Transporter (T6), generation T6
An electric van under the Volkswagen ID. series is planned to begin production in 2022, derived from the I.D. Buzz (Electric Microbus) and ID. Buzz Cargo concept vehicles.

Heavy commercial vehicles
Volkswagen Volksbus, built by Brazilian company Volkswagen Caminhões e Ônibus

References

Bus
Former disambiguation pages converted to set index articles